All Lost is a studio album by English dreampop band Monster Movie. It was released by Artoffact Records on 16 May 2006.

Monster Movie relies not only on guitar; electronic instruments are heavily present on most tracks.

Critical reception
AllMusic wrote that Monster Movie "combine their early 1990s shoegazer roots with a classic mid-'60s pop sensibility to produce a richly imagined set."

Track listing
Behm (2:20)
Vanishing Act (4:08)
The Stars That Surround You (4:40)
Return To Yesterday (4:57)
Hope I Find The Moon (2:24)
Driving Through The Red Lights (3:06)
The Impossible (5:35)
 3# (5:10)
No One Can Know (4:15)
Run To The Heart Of The Sunrise (3:37)
Vertical Planes (3:11)
Falling Into The Sun (7:14)

References

External links
Stormingthevase.com 

2006 albums